Rive d'Arcano is a comune (municipality) in the Province of Udine in the Italian region Friuli-Venezia Giulia, located about  northwest of Trieste and about  northwest of Udine.

Rive d'Arcano borders the following municipalities: Colloredo di Monte Albano, Coseano, Dignano, Fagagna, Majano, San Daniele del Friuli, San Vito di Fagagna.

Demographic evolution

References

Cities and towns in Friuli-Venezia Giulia